Hexethal (Ortal) is a barbiturate derivative invented in the 1940s. It has sedative, anxiolytic, muscle relaxant, and anticonvulsant properties, and was used primarily as an anaesthetic in veterinary medicine.

Hexethal is considered similar in effects to pentobarbital, with a very fast onset of action but short duration of effects.

References 

Barbiturates
GABAA receptor positive allosteric modulators